Truku may refer to:

Truku people, Taiwanese indigenous people
Truku language, language of Truku people

See also
Truku War